The  Edmonton Football Team season was scheduled to be the 63rd season for the team in the Canadian Football League and their 72nd overall. On July 21, 2020, the team officially retired the "Eskimos" name, and temporarily began using "Edmonton Football Team" and "EE Football Team" until a new name was decided.

Training camps, pre-season games, and regular season games were initially postponed due to the COVID-19 pandemic in Alberta. The CFL announced on April 7, 2020 that the start of the 2020 season would not occur before July 2020. On May 20, 2020, it was announced that the league would likely not begin regular season play prior to September 2020. On August 17, 2020 however, the season was officially cancelled due to COVID-19. 

This would have been the first season under head coach Scott Milanovich following the dismissal of Jason Maas following the 2019 season. This also would have been the fourth season under general manager Brock Sunderland.

Offseason

CFL National Draft
The 2020 CFL National Draft took place on April 30, 2020. The team had nine selections in the eight-round draft after acquiring another seventh-round pick from the Toronto Argonauts.

CFL Global Draft
The 2020 CFL Global Draft was scheduled to take place on April 16, 2020. However, due to the COVID-19 pandemic, this draft and its accompanying combine were postponed to occur just before the start of training camp, which was ultimately cancelled. The team was scheduled to select fourth in each round with the number of rounds never announced.

Planned schedule

Preseason

Regular season

Team

Roster

Coaching staff

References

External links
 

Edmonton Elks seasons
2020 Canadian Football League season by team
2020 in Alberta